Tabou Department is a department of San-Pédro Region in Bas-Sassandra District, Ivory Coast. In 2021, its population was 270,482 and its seat is the settlement of Tabou. The sub-prefectures of the department are Dapo-Iboké, Djamandioké, Djouroutou, Grabo,  Olodio, and Tabou. It is the southernmost department of Ivory Coast.

History
Tabou Department was created in 1988 as a first-level subdivision via a split-off from Sassandra Department.

In 1997, regions were introduced as new first-level subdivisions of Ivory Coast; as a result, all departments were converted into second-level subdivisions. Tabou Department was included in Bas-Sassandra Region.

In 2011, districts were introduced as new first-level subdivisions of Ivory Coast. At the same time, regions were reorganised and became second-level subdivisions and all departments were converted into third-level subdivisions. At this time, Tabou Department became part of San-Pédro Region in Bas-Sassandra District.

Transport
The department is serviced by Tabou Airport.

Notes

Departments of San-Pédro Region
1988 establishments in Ivory Coast
States and territories established in 1988